Shivering King and Others is the third album of Washington, D.C. based band Dead Meadow. It was released on CD and double LP by Matador Records in 2003.

Track listing 
 "I Love You Too" - 7:16
 "Babbling Flower" - 4:48
 "Everything's Going On" - 7:05
 "The Whirlings" - 3:24
 "Wayfarers All" - 1:41
 "Good Moanin'" - 6:41
 "Golden Cloud" - 6:32
 "Me and the Devil Blues" - 3:37
 "Shivering King" - 5:59
 "She's Mine" - 1:18
 "Heaven" - 6:51
 "Raise the Sails" - 6:52

Critical Reception
AllMusic gave a positive review towards the album, complimenting both its short punchier songs and its lengthier ballads, calling it "Bludgeoning and beautiful all at once". Pitchfork gave a mostly positive review, particularly appreciating its shorter songs and added themes "with influences ranging from post-rock to black-metal", however felt that the 2 ending, longer, songs were overly repetitive with the same motifs repeated.

References

Dead Meadow albums
2003 albums